Mattel Films is the film production division of Mattel originally formed on October 16, 2013, as Mattel Playground Productions as part of Mattel Global Brands, a unified media structural and strategy unit.

On March 31, 2016, Mattel placed the division within a newly-created division at the time, Mattel Creations, absorbed its operations into it and, seven months later, made it defunct due to the box office reception of the live-action film release of Max Steel. On September 6, 2018, the division was revived and reformed as Mattel Films.

History 
Since the 1970s, Mattel has teamed up with numerous producers and studios to adapt its portfolio into feature-length films. This includes a joint venture in 1970 with producer Robert B. Radnitz, which produced family films including Sounder, Where the Lilies Bloom, and A Hero Ain't Nothin' but a Sandwich. 

In 2013, Mattel launched Playground Productions (shortened as Mattel PGP or just PGP) as its in-house film studio to handle multimedia productions and foster creative storytelling for its brands for global multi-platform distribution. Its first animated project was Team Hot Wheels: The Origin of Awesome!. Mattel had been developing a live-action Hot Wheels film at Legendary Entertainment and Universal Pictures, films featuring the Masters of the Universe and Barbie brands at Columbia Pictures, a Monster High film with Universal and a Max Steel film with Dolphin Entertainment. PGP was planned to set up three-year storytelling plans that incorporate every part of the company's core operations, from toy designers to consumer products and marketing. David Voss, an acclaimed 20-year veteran in the toy and entertainment business, was appointed as the division's head and Senior Vice President.

With WWE on March 17, 2014, Mattel PGP launched an online short form series, WWE Slam City, to go along with its dedicated toy line. The series was picked up by Nicktoons' NickSports programming block from October 22, 2014.

After Voss left the division in January 2016 for subscription service, Loot Crate, Mattel placed PGP within Mattel Creations upon its formation along with its other two content production units: HIT Entertainment and the content creation team of American Girl at Middleton, Wisconsin. After the critical and commercial failure of the live-action Max Steel film on October 20, 2016, Mattel Playground Productions was absorbed into Mattel Creations.

Reformation as Mattel Films
On September 6, 2018, Mattel announced the launch of a film division, Mattel Films, that will make films based on the company's toy brands. Outside Mattel, the division is widely recognized as the revival and replacement of Mattel PGP. Acclaimed film producer Robbie Brenner was appointed to head the division as executive producer and will report directly to Mattel's CEO, Ynon Kreiz.

The revived division's first two projects will be the Barbie and Masters of the Universe live-action films. On January 7, 2019, it was announced that Margot Robbie was going to star in the Barbie film to be co-produced with Warner Bros. Pictures and Robbie's production company, LuckyChap Entertainment.

With the Hot Wheels films rights option with Legendary Entertainment expired and reverted back to Mattel, Mattel Films shopped the property to Warner Bros. for a partnership on a film for the first time on January 29, 2019. The company teamed up with Universal Pictures for the first time on July 16, 2020, on adaptation of Wishbone to film.

On April 19, 2021, Mattel Films teamed up with Universal Pictures and Vin Diesel's One Race Films for a live-action film adaptation of the 1966-launched toy, Rock 'Em Sock 'Em Robots, starring Diesel himself.

On June 24, 2021, Mattel Films and Metro-Goldwyn-Mayer agreed to work on a live-action film for Polly Pocket.

On December 16, 2021, Mattel Films announced its first project based on outside intellectual property: Christmas Balloon, which is written by Gabriela Revilla Lugo. The film is intended to be based on the true story of a young girl who tried to send her Christmas message to Santa via a balloon.

In July 2022, Mattel Films and Skydance announced the development of a live-action movie based on the Matchbox die-cast toy vehicles.

Filmography

References 

Mattel
Films based on Mattel toys
2013 establishments in California
American companies established in 2013
Companies based in El Segundo, California
Mass media companies established in 2013
Film production companies of the United States